Ali Morad Khvah (also Romanized as ‘Alī Morād Khvāh; also known as Qal‘eh ‘Alī Morād, Qal‘eh-ye ‘Alī Morād, and Qal‘eh-ye ‘Alī Morād Khān) is a village in Sefidkuh Rural District, Samen District, Malayer County, Hamadan Province, Iran. At the 2006 census, its population was 495, in 123 families.

References 

Populated places in Malayer County